Aleksandar Janković (born 16 September 1995) is a Dutch professional footballer who plays as a midfielder for ACV Assen.

Career

Early career
Janković was born in Rotterdam, as son of Serbian father and Dutch mother originating from Cape Verde. He started in SC Feyenoord. At the age of 7 he moved to Sparta Rotterdam, but after a year returned to Feyenoord's youth school. He spent ages 10 to 16 in Serbia, playing for his father's club OFK Jankec Čačak, and later for FK Guča, Borac Čačak, and Sloga Kraljevo. After returning to the Netherlands, he played for Groningen's and ADO Den Haag's youth teams.

Radnički Kragujevac
Janković joined Radnički Kragujevac in summer of 2014. He made professional Jelen SuperLiga debut for the club Neško Milovanović on 22 November 2014, in a home match against Red Star Belgrade which ended 0–0 result under coach. He was substituted in for Dragan Milovanović in the 90th minute of the match.

Career statistics

References

External links
 
 Aleksandar Janković stats at utakmica.rs 
 

1995 births
Living people
Footballers from Rotterdam
Association football midfielders
Dutch footballers
Dutch expatriate footballers
Dutch people of Serbian descent
Dutch sportspeople of Cape Verdean descent
FK Radnički 1923 players
De Graafschap players
Achilles '29 players
SC Feyenoord players
FK Sloboda Užice players
De Treffers players
MFK Lokomotíva Zvolen players
VfB Oldenburg players
Atlas Delmenhorst players
FK Jedinstvo Ub players
Asser Christelijke Voetbalvereniging players
Serbian SuperLiga players
Serbian First League players
Eerste Divisie players
Tweede Divisie players
2. Liga (Slovakia) players
Regionalliga players
Dutch expatriate sportspeople in Serbia
Dutch expatriate sportspeople in Slovakia
Dutch expatriate sportspeople in Germany
Expatriate footballers in Serbia
Expatriate footballers in Slovakia
Expatriate footballers in Germany